A Charleston cottage is a vernacular form of house found in Charleston, South Carolina.

The houses often have only two rooms with one or both having doors onto a piazza on the side. The houses often had less than 500 square feet. The two rooms are arranged perpendicularly to the street and often have a fireplace between the front and rear room with a shared flue. The form is sometimes compared to the Charleston single house; a Charleston single house also has two rooms per floor arranged perpendicularly to the street, often with piazzas, but divides the two room with a short staircase to the upper floors.

Although commonly called "freedman's cottages," suggesting that the small houses were built after the American Civil War by newly freed people, the house form was actually popular with working-class families of all races and backgrounds until the early 20th century. The "freedman's cottage" name was not used until the 1990s, and most of the examples were built between 1880 and 1910.

Gallery

References

American architectural styles
Architecture in South Carolina
History of Charleston, South Carolina
House styles
Working-class culture in South Carolina